A deputy leadership election for the Labour Party in the United Kingdom took place on 2 October 1988 when John Prescott and Eric Heffer challenged Labour's incumbent Deputy Leader Roy Hattersley. Hattersley had served in the position since 1983.

The election was conducted using the Labour Party's Electoral College. Delegates at Labour Party conference voted in the election, with 40% of votes going to affiliated unions, 30% to constituency parties and 30% to the Parliamentary Labour Party.

The challenge to Hattersley's position was unsuccessful, and he retained the deputy leadership of the party by a wide margin. He served until 1992, when he resigned following Labour's defeat in the 1992 general election.

Candidates
 Roy Hattersley, incumbent Deputy Leader, Shadow Home Secretary, Member of Parliament for Birmingham Sparkbrook
 Eric Heffer, former Shadow Secretary of State for Housing and Construction, Member of Parliament for Liverpool Walton
 John Prescott, Shadow Secretary of State for Energy, Member of Parliament for Kingston upon Hull East

Result

References

 Butler, David & Butler, Gareth (2006). British political facts since 1979 (p. 55). Basingstoke: Palgrave Macmillan. 

1988
1988 elections in the United Kingdom
Labour Party deputy leadership election